WFRZ-LD, virtual and UHF digital channel 33, is a low-powered religious television station licensed to Montgomery, Alabama, United States. The station is owned by the Frazer Memorial United Methodist Church.

History

The station was founded by Jerry Kemp, a Frazer Memorial member, who started the Frazer TV Ministry in 1983. The television station began operations in early 1993. In addition to network programming, the station airs Frazer's worship services, other church activities, and other local programming. WFRZ flash-cut from analog to digital in February, 2009. The station manager is Will Adams. Effective June 1, 2014, WFRZ is now a part of the Media Department of Frazer.  The Media Director for Frazer is Ken Roach.

Digital channels
The station's digital signal is multiplexed:

Programming

Programs produced by WFRZ
Frazer Family Hour (traditional services from Frazer UMC)
Frazer Contemporary Hour (contemporary services from Frazer UMC)

Other WFRZ programming
Crossroads - First Baptist Montgomery
Ridgecrest Baptist Hour - Montgomery
First UMC - Montgomery
The Methodist Hour - Hattiesburg, Mississippi
First Baptist - Greenville, Mississippi
Huntingdon Athletics
Venture Outdoors
Harbor Light with Dr. Andy Harris
Reality and Truth with Ladonna Brendle
The Source with Elvyn and Bessie Hamilton

References

External links
Frazer Memorial United Methodist Church

Religious television stations in the United States
FRZ-LD
Low-power television stations in the United States
Television channels and stations established in 1993